Christopher Perez (born June 21, 1969) is a former American football offensive tackle who played six seasons in the Canadian Football League (CFL) with the Memphis Mad Dogs, Toronto Argonauts, Winnipeg Blue Bombers and BC Lions. He was drafted by the Miami Dolphins in the fifth round of the 1992 NFL Draft. He played college football at the University of Kansas and attended William Fremd High School in Palatine, Illinois. Perez was also a member of the New England Patriots, Phoenix Cardinals, Green Bay Packers, Barcelona Dragons and Chicago Enforcers.

College career
Perez played for the Kansas Jayhawks from 1988 to 1991.

Professional career
Perez was selected by the Miami Dolphins of the National Football League (NFL) with the 124th pick in the 1992 NFL Draft. He was signed by the Dolphins on July 18, 1992. He was released by the Dolphins on August 26, 1992. Perez was signed by the NFL's New England Patriots on March 5, 1993. He was released by the Patriots on August 30 and signed to the team's practice squad on August 31, 1993. He was released by the Patriots on October 27, 1993. On November 17, 1993, Perez was signed to the practice squad of the Phoenix Cardinals of the NFL. He spent the 1994 off-season with the NFL's Green Bay Packers. He was released by the Packers on July 21, 1994. Perez was selected by the Barcelona Dragons of the World League of American Football (WLAF) with the 22nd pick in the 1995 WLAF Draft and played for the team during the 1995 season.

He played in eighteen games for the Memphis Mad Dogs of the CFL in 1995. He played in eighteen games for the CFL's Toronto Argonauts in 1996, earning CFL All-Star and CFL East All-Star honors. The Argonauts won the 84th Grey Cup on November 24, 1996 against the Edmonton Eskimos. Perez played for the Winnipeg Blue Bombers of the CFL from 1997 to 1999, appearing in 54 games for the team and garnering CFL East All-Star recognition. He was traded to the BC Lions of the CFL on February 28, 2000 for Khari Jones and  B.C.'s fourth round draft choice. He played in eighteen games for the Lions in 2000, earning CFL All-Star and CFL West All-Star honors. The Lions won the 88th Grey Cup on November 26, 2000 against the Montreal Alouettes.

Perez played for the Chicago Enforcers of the XFL in 2001 and was named to the All-XFL Team.

References

External links
Just Sports Stats

Living people
1969 births
American football offensive tackles
Canadian football offensive linemen
American players of Canadian football
Kansas Jayhawks football players
Miami Dolphins players
New England Patriots players
Phoenix Cardinals players
Green Bay Packers players
Barcelona Dragons players
Memphis Mad Dogs players
Toronto Argonauts players
Winnipeg Blue Bombers players
BC Lions players
Chicago Enforcers players
Players of American football from Illinois
Sportspeople from Park Ridge, Illinois
American expatriate players of American football